Janne Keränen (born 30 June 1987) is a Finnish ice hockey player who currently playing for Vaasan Sport of the Liiga.

Career statistics

Regular season and playoffs

References

External links

1987 births
Living people
People from Nurmijärvi
Finnish ice hockey forwards
HIFK players
Lukko players
KalPa players
Vaasan Sport players
HK Dukla Michalovce players
Sportspeople from Uusimaa
Finnish expatriate ice hockey players in Slovakia